Old Airport may refer to:

 Old Airport (Doha)
 Old Airport, Brunei